Katarzyna Dominika Bratkowska (born in 1972) is a Polish literary critic, feminist, and socialist activist.

Biography

Education
A graduate of Polish philology at the University of Warsaw, she completed doctoral studies at the School of Social Sciences at the Institute of Philosophy and Sociology of the Polish Academy of Sciences, where she wrote a doctorate under the direction of Maria Janion. In 2008-2009 she lectured in postgraduate gender studies at the Institute of Literary Research of the Polish Academy of Sciences. She has published in "Res Publica Nowa", "Biuletyn OSKa", "Czas Kultury", "Gazeta Wyborcza", and in several edited academic volumes on women and gender.

Activism
She is the co-founder (together with Kazimiera Szczuka and Agnieszka Graff) of the 8th March Women's Coalition which organizes the Manifa, an annual demonstration taking place in various Polish cities on International Women's Day. In the years 2001–2006 she co-founded the feminist hip-hop group Duldung. She is deeply engaged in the struggle to restore women's right to legal abortion in Poland. She caused an uproar when she declared that she was pregnant and intended to get an abortion on Christmas Eve. She is a co-founder and president of the Polish pro-choice association Same o Sobie S.O.S. in 2006 and the initiator of the "Abortion coming out" campaign, in which women confessed to having an abortion. She sat on the supervisory board of the MaMa Foundation.

With Kazimiera Szczuka, she issued the Duża książka o aborcji [The big book about abortion], which aimed to inform adolescents and women of the rights they have and explain what they can do in the case of unwanted pregnancy. Just few months after the premiere, a negative campaign started to remove the book
from store shelves dedicated to adolescents. Book stores surrendered to public pressure and restricted the book to shelves dedicated to adults.

She is a member of the board of the Polish Labor Party, and also a member of the Committee for Assistance and Defense of Repressed Workers. She has described communism as "the most pro-human system."

Selected publications
(with Kazimiera Szczuka): Duża książka o aborcji. Warszawa: Wydawnictwo Czarna Owca, 2011.
Mak z popiołem in Siostry i ich Kopciuszek. Gdynia: Uraeus, 2002.

References

1972 births
Polish socialists
Polish socialist feminists
Polish abortion-rights activists
Living people